The City of Banyule is a local government area in Victoria, Australia in the north-eastern suburbs of Melbourne. It was created under the Local Government Act 1989 and established in 1994 as an amalgamation of former councils. In 1994 it had a population of 116,000. In June 2018 Banyule had a population of 130,237. The Yarra River runs along the City's southern border while its western border is defined by Darebin Creek.

The City moved their main offices from Ivanhoe to Greensborough in 2017. A brand-new civic centre was constructed, including three-level offices to accommodate 320 council staff, community and function rooms.

History
The area was originally occupied by the Wurundjeri, Indigenous Australians of the Kulin nation, who spoke variations of the Woiwurrung language group.

The City was named after the Indigenous Australian term Banyule or "Banyool", and was originally the name of a locality within the former City of Heidelberg before being adopted as the name of the new Council during the amalgamation of local government areas in Victoria. It was formed in December 1994 from the merger of the City of Heidelberg with parts of the Shires of Diamond Valley and Eltham.

The City also has some significant heritage within its boundaries. Significant buildings listed on the Victorian Heritage Register include:

Charterisville (1840)
Banyule (1846)
Ravenswood (1891)
Chadwick House (1904)
Heidelberg Town Hall (1937)

There are a number of housing estates designed by leading early 20th Century architects Walter Burley Griffin and Marion Mahony Griffin and by property developer Albert Victor (A.V.) Jennings, some of the most significant art deco buildings in Melbourne, and the world's first Olympics athletes' village.

Banyule is the birthplace of the Heidelberg School of Art, which was formed when a group of artists, including Tom Roberts, Arthur Streeton, Frederick McCubbin, Walter Withers, Charles Conder and others moved to a shack on Mount Eagle (now known as Eaglemont) and began painting the landscape in a uniquely Australian way during the late 1880s.

Former councils

Former councils which formed part of Banyule council's current jurisdiction prior to their amalgamation include:

 City of Heidelberg (all apart from the Bundoora Health precinct)
 Shire of Diamond Valley (all apart from the area north of Greensborough Highway, the Bundoora Health precinct and the eastern part of Eltham North)
 Shire of Eltham (suburbs of Montmorency and Lower Plenty only).

Wards and councillors

The current councillors of the City after the elections in October 2020 are:

Townships and localities
The 2021 census, the city had a population of 126,236 up from 121,865 in the 2016 census

^ - Territory divided with another LGA

Notable people

Facilities
Ivanhoe Library, Rosanna Library and Watsonia Library are operated by Yarra Plenty Regional Library. A mobile library service to West Heidelberg is also operated by Yarra Plenty Regional Library.

Heidelberg Historical Society is a varied group of people with a shared interest in understanding and preserving the history of Heidelberg and surrounding suburbs.

Warringal Conservation Society is a community group which advocates for the green spaces of Banyule and beyond.

U3A Banyule provides learning opportunities especially for people of 50 years and older.

See also

City of Heidelberg

References

External links
 
 Official website
Yarra Plenty Regional Library
Public Transport Victoria local public transport map
Link to Land Victoria interactive maps

Local government areas of Melbourne
Greater Melbourne (region)